Jack Cody (April 1, 1885 – April 11, 1963) was an American swimming coach in Oregon. He coached at the Multnomah Athletic Club in Portland, Oregon for more than 30 years, winning 3 national championships and producing 15 Olympic swimmers.

Early career
A diver, Cody came to the Multnomah Athletic Club in 1913 and his coaching brought national prominence to Constance Meyer. He was the first coach of Norman Ross, a swimming world record setter and multiple gold medal winner at the 1920 Summer Olympics. In those same Olympics, his diving students Thelma Payne, Hap Kuehn, and Louis Balbach all medaled in diving.

"Cody's Kids"
His greatest fame came from 1939 to 1949 with the emergence of a group of his students who came to be known as "Cody's Kids": Nancy Merki, Brenda Helser, Suzanne Zimmerman, Joyce Macrae, Geneva Klaus, and Mary Anne Hansen, who dominated U.S. girls amateur swimming, winning three national Amateur Athletic Union swimming titles (in 1943, 1944, and 1949), 42 individual championships, and 16 relay championships, setting numerous records along the way.

The cancellation of the 1940 and 1944 Summer Olympics due to World War II prevented the swimmers from having a chance to appear in the Olympics at their peak of their careers, though Zimmerman and Helser did win medals in the 1948 games.

Legacy
Cody retired from the MAC in 1949 and moved to Los Angeles, where he continued teaching and coaching. He died in Santa Monica, California on April 11, 1963. He is a member of the International Swimming Hall of Fame, the Oregon Sports Hall of Fame, and the American Swimming Coaches Association Hall of Fame.

See also
 List of members of the International Swimming Hall of Fame

References

1885 births
1963 deaths
Sportspeople from Portland, Oregon
American swimming coaches
Swimming in Oregon